Terry Saunders was a film and Broadway performer. She is most widely known for playing Lady Thiang in the film and stage versions of The King And I, first as a replacement on Broadway, then in the film, performing the song "Something Wonderful" in both. Saunders had five other roles on Broadway  and guest starred on an episode of Make Room For Daddy. She died in 2012.

Filmography

References

2012 deaths
American stage actresses
American film actresses
American television actresses
21st-century American women